Third Chance is a web-contest organized by Sveriges Television. Thirty-two unsuccessful Melodifestivalen entries in the past ten years will have a third opportunity for a spot in the grand final. The third chance procedure is similar to the actual one, there will be four rounds of third chances (four semi-finals), a last chance (second-chance) and the final. There will be ten participants in the grand final. The winner will be decided by internet viewers and an expert jury while the qualifiers from the semi-finals will be decided by the internet viewers only.

First edition (2012)
The first edition of Third Chance took place in January 2012, when Melodifestivalen 2012 began. Every week fans from Sweden, Europe and the rest of the world could vote their favourite song with 2 winners from each round (total 8 songs) to the finals and 8 songs for a last chance with available 2 spots left for the final.

Semi-final 1

Semi-final 2

Semi-final 3

Semi-final 4

Last Chance (Sista chansen)

Final

References

Melodifestivalen